Charles Petit-Dutaillis (26 January 1868 – 10 July 1947) was a French medieval historian.

Publications 

 Études sur la vie et le règne de Louis VIII, Paris, 1894. Bibliothèque de l'École des Hautes-Études, n° 101.
 Le soulèvement des travailleurs d’Angleterre en 1831, 1898.
 « Charles VII, Louis XI et les premières années de Charles VIII (1422-1492) », in Histoire de France, de E. Lavisse, Paris, Hachette, 1902.
 Documents nouveaux sur les mœurs populaires et le droit de vengeance dans les Pays-Bas au XVe s., 1908.
 Le déshéritement de Jean sans Terre et le meurtre d'Arthur de Bretagne, Paris, F. Alcan, 1925.
 La monarchie féodale en France et en Angleterre, xe – xiiie siècle, Paris, la Renaissance du livre, 1933.
 « L'essor des États d'Occident : France, Angleterre, Péninsule ibérique », in Histoire du Moyen Âge, sous la direction de Gustave Glotz, Paris, PUF, 1937.
 Les Communes françaises, caractères et évolution des origines au xviiie siècle, Paris, A. Michel, 1947.

References 

 A. Merlin, « Notice sur la vie et les travaux de M. Charles Petit-Dutaillis », Comptes rendus de l'Académie des inscriptions et belles-lettres, 1953, p. 416–427.
 C. Brunel, « Charles Petit-Dutaillis », Bibliothèque de l'École des chartes, t. 107, 1947, p. 178–181.
 G. Caplat, Paris, 1997, p. 431–436.
 Dictionnaire national des contemporains, Nath Imbert, 1936, tome 2, p. 479
 Alfred Merlin, Notice sur la vie et les travaux de Charles Petit-Dutaillis, novembre-décembre 1953, p. 415–427.
 Guy Caplat, L'Inspection générale de l'Instruction publique : Dictionnaire biographique, t. 2 : 1914–1939, Paris, INRP-CNRS, 1997, p. 431–436.
 Sidney R. Packard, « Some Reflections on the Life and Work of Charles Petit-Dutaillis (1868-1947) », in Speculum, A Journal of Medieval Studies, vol. 34, 1959.
 F. Olivier-Martin, « Éloge funèbre de M. Charles Petit-Dutaillis », Comptes rendus de l'Académie des inscriptions et belles-lettres, 1947, p. 456-462 (lire en ligne [archive], consulté le 1er janvier 2014).

1868 births
1947 deaths
Place of birth missing
Place of death missing
French medievalists
Corresponding Fellows of the British Academy